Ceratostoma fournieri is a species of sea snail, a marine gastropod mollusk in the family Muricidae, the murex snails or rock snails.

References

External links
 MNHN, Paris : syntype
 Sowerby, G. B., I; Sowerby, G. B., II. (1832-1841). The conchological illustrations or, Coloured figures of all the hitherto unfigured recent shells. London, privately published

Muricidae
Gastropods described in 1861